Fat storage-inducing transmembrane protein 1 is a protein that in humans is encoded by the FITM1 gene.

Function

FIT1 belongs to an evolutionarily conserved family of proteins involved in fat storage (Kadereit et al., 2008 [PubMed 18160536]).[supplied by OMIM, May 2008].

References